The year 1652 in music involved some significant events.

Events 
Adam Drese becomes Kapellmeister to Duke Wilhelm IV of Saxe-Weimar.
Anthoni van Noordt becomes the organist of Nieuwezijdskapel.
Giovanni Antonio Pandolfi Mealli (1624-1687) becomes court musician at Innsbruck

Publications 
Henry Du Mont – Cantica sacra, a collection of sacred music

Classical music 
Denis Gaultier – Le Rhétorique des Dieux (the Eloquence of the Gods), a manuscript collection of 56 lute pieces

Opera 
Antonio Bertali – Niobe
Francesco Cavalli – Eritrea

Births 
April 28 – Magdalena Sibylla of Hesse-Darmstadt, composer of hymns (died 1712)
May 14 – Johann Philipp Förtsch, composer and doctor (died 1732)
date unknown – Diego Xaraba, composer (died 1715)

Deaths 
February 17 – Gregorio Allegri, Italian composer (born 1582)
April 21 – Pietro Della Valle, traveller, composer and writer on music (born 1586)
November – Charles Fleury, lutenist (born c.1605)
date unknown – Filipe de Magalhães, choirmaster and composer (born c.1571)

References 

 
17th century in music
Music by year